Naira Gelashvili (born 28 October 1947) is a Georgian fiction writer, philologist, Germanist, and civil society activist.

Life and career
Gelashvili graduated from the Faculty of Western European Literature, Tbilisi State University, in 1970. She has published a series of stories and the novel dedis otakhi (დედის ოთახი; "The Mother’s Room", 1985). She is one of the most ardent followers of European existentialist prose in modern Georgian literature. Gelashvili has also studied folklore of the Caucasian peoples and heads the cultural NGO The Caucasian House.

Bibliography

Novels and short story collections
 Ich bin sie. Roman (translation from Georgian into German by Lia Wittek), Verbrecher Verlag, Berlin 2017, 
 Mother’s Room (1987)
 The Moonlit Garden (1990)
 Tragic Gradation
 Hut of Dots 
 Pieces of Mirror (2006)
 The Ambri, the Umbri and the Arab (1982)
 Short Stories
 I am that One (2012)

Poetry
 About Peace, Sorrow and Consolation (Four poems, 1997)
 Time, Bread and Wine (A collection of verses, poems and songs, 2006)

Awards
Literary prize “Saba” for the best novel of the year for "I am That One" (2013)
Literary prize “Saba” for the best novel of the year for “The First Two Circles and all the Others” (2010)
Ilia Chavchavadze State Prize for Artistic Work
Literary prize "Gala" for the best literary project for Rainer Maria Rilke (works in five volumes with commentaries) (2007)
Prize of Austrian Ministry of Culture for translations of R. M. Rilke works (1999)

References 

1947 births
Philologists from Georgia (country)
Activists from Georgia (country)
Living people
20th-century writers from Georgia (country)
21st-century writers from Georgia (country)
20th-century women writers from Georgia (country)
21st-century women writers from Georgia (country)